Season six of Dancing with the Stars premiered on March 17, 2008. 

On May 6, Dancing with the Stars had a special two-hour episode to commemorate its 100th episode.

Olympic figure skater Kristi Yamaguchi and Mark Ballas won the competition, while Miami Dolphins defensive end Jason Taylor and Edyta Śliwińska finished in second place, and actor Cristián de la Fuente and Cheryl Burke finished in third.

Cast

Couples
The show followed the format of previous seasons, with twelve couples. The contestants were announced during the season finale of Dance War: Bruno vs. Carrie Ann by season two contestants Lisa Rinna, Jerry Rice, and Kenny Mayne.

Hosts and judges 
Tom Bergeron and Samantha Harris returned as co-hosts, while Carrie Ann Inaba, Len Goodman, and Bruno Tonioli returned as judges.

Scoring charts

Notes

 : This was the lowest score of the week.
 : This was the highest score of the week.
 :  This couple finished in first place.
 :  This couple finished in second place.
 :  This couple finished in third place.
 :  This couple was in the bottom two, but was not eliminated.
 :  This couple was eliminated.

Highest and lowest scoring performances 
The highest and lowest performances in each dance according to the judges' 30-point scale are as follows.

Couples' highest and lowest scoring dances
Scores are based upon a potential 30-point maximum.

Weekly scores
Individual judges' scores in the charts below (given in parentheses) are listed in this order from left to right: Carrie Ann Inaba, Len Goodman, Bruno Tonioli.

Week 1
Each couple performed either the cha-cha-cha or the foxtrot. The men performed on the first night and the women on the second. Couples are listed in the order they performed. 
Night 1 - Men

Night 2 - Women

Week 2
Each couple performed either the mambo or the quickstep. Two couples were eliminated at the end of the night in the series' first ever double elimination. Couples are listed in the order they performed.

Week 3
Each couple performed either the jive or the tango. Couples are listed in the order they performed.

Week 4
Each couple performed either the paso doble or the Viennese waltz. Couples are listed in the order they performed.

Week 5
Each couple performed either the rumba or the samba. Couples are listed in the order they performed.

Week 6
Each couple performed one unlearned dance and a two-step group dance. Couples are listed in the order they performed.

Week 7
Each couple performed two unlearned dances. Couples are listed in the order they performed.

Week 8
Each couple performed two unlearned dances. Couples are listed in the order they performed.

Week 9: Semifinals
Each couple performed two dance styles already performed earlier in the season. Couples are listed in the order they performed.

Week 10: Finals
On the first night, the couples danced a cha-cha-cha face-off and a freestyle. On the second night, the final two couples performed their favorite dance of the season. Couples are listed in the order they performed.
Night 1

Night 2

Dance chart
The celebrities and professional partners danced one of these routines for each corresponding week:
 Week 1: One unlearned dance (cha-cha-cha or foxtrot)
 Week 2: One unlearned dance (mambo or quickstep)
 Week 3: One unlearned dance (jive or tango)
 Week 4: One unlearned dance (paso doble or Viennese waltz)
 Week 5: One unlearned dance (rumba or samba)
 Week 6: One unlearned dance & two-step group dance
 Week 7: Two unlearned dances
 Week 8: Two unlearned dances
 Week 9: Two dances
 Week 10 (Night 1): Cha-cha-cha face-off & freestyle
 Week 10 (Night 2): Favorite dance of the season

Notes

 :  This was the highest scoring dance of the week.
 :  This was the lowest scoring dance of the week.
 :  This couple danced, but received no scores.

References

External links

Dancing with the Stars (American TV series)
2008 American television seasons